Shape Island is an American animated children's television family comedy series based on the children's books Triangle, Circle, and Square written by Mac Barnett and illustrated by Jon Klassen. It features Harvey Guillén as the voice of Square, Gideon Adlon as the voice of Circle, and Scott Adsit as the voice of Triangle.  The show premiered on Apple TV+ on January 20, 2023, where it is available to stream.

Shape Island is a production of Bix Pix Entertainment.  Each episode has two animated segments per half hour episode.

Premise
Set on a fictional island, the series follows the story of three anthropomorphic shapes: Square, Circle, and Triangle.  Each shape has a unique personality that often tests each other's patience, but their friendship is maintained throughout the series.

Characters

 Square (voiced by Harvey Guillén) is a cube.  He is the most fastidious of the shapes, but always rises to the occasion when called upon for action.  He pushes blocks around for a living and likes order and routine.
 Circle (voiced by Gideon Adlon) is a sphere.  She is the oldest, most powerful, and wisest shape on the island.  Unlike the other two shapes, Circle has magic powers.  For example, she can fly, grow very large, and has telekinesis.  
 Triangle (voiced by Scott Adsit) is a pyramid.  He is the messiest, silliest, and most disorganized of the shapes.  These personality traits often puts him in conflict with Square.  
 The show is narrated by Yvette Nicole Brown.

Episodes

Season 1 (2023)

Production 
The show is directed by Drew Hodges and is executive produced by Mac Barnett, Jon Klassen, Kelli Bixler, and Hodges.  Barnett and Klassen always envisioned their children's book trilogy as a children's television series.  The characters in the series, like in the books, are complex and driven by their personalities instead of plot or themes, while stop-motion animation was chosen to give the show a three-dimensional feel that is simple, not out of reach, and recognizable to children.  Emmy and Annie award-winning animation studio Bix Pix Entertainment joined the series, syncing with the authors' vision and executing their ideas with the help of head writer Ryan Pequin. The writers faced challenges in adapting the books to screen, but they were able to overcome these difficulties by working closely with the production team at Bix Pix Entertainment.  It took two and a half years to produce the first season of the show plus an additional four to five years of developing and pitching the show.  Due to the laborious process of stop motion animation, the production schedule was about 20 months.

Barnett described the voice actors as "gifted comedians" and the experience of working with them was enjoyable to him. Harvey Guillen explained how he developed the voice of Square: "We knew that we wanted Square to be very empathetic, very endearing and sweet, and not causing too much trouble, always playing by the rules, but also to show that we could relate to him.  We could be on his side.  So, even though he goes through challenges, we relate to him as well." Due to their busy schedules, the actors often recorded their parts separately from each other.

Release 
The show premiered on Apple TV+ internationally in 2023.

Reception 
Common Sense Media wrote, "Aesthetically, the show has gorgeous visuals, stop-motion animation, and music.  Grown-ups may also appreciate the slower pace and lower-key dialogue compared to many preschool series." Cult of Mac praised the show, specifically the writing, animation, and the voice cast: "Shape Island is marvelously animated, hysterically performed, carefully written and beautifully directed.  It’s a stop-motion home run for Apple TV+." The show was also recommended by the New York Times: "The show’s sense of warmth extends beyond its attitude to its enchanting design; its sun-dappled beaches and glowing forest groves could bring Instagram to its knees, and Square could give an Architectural Digest tour of his Scandi-Bohemian minimalist kitchen."

References

External links
 Official website
 

2020s American animated television series
2020s American children's comedy television series
2023 American television series debuts
American children's animated comedy television series
American children's animated education television series
American stop-motion animated television series
American television shows based on children's books
English-language television shows
Apple TV+ original programming
Apple TV+ children's programming